Burgl Färbinger (born 10 October 1945) is a German former alpine skier who competed in the 1964 Winter Olympics and 1968 Winter Olympics. She was born in Oberau, Bavaria, Germany. She had been married to the luger Max Leo.

Olympic events 
1964 Winter Olympics, competing for United Team of Germany:
 Women's downhill – 12th place
 Women's giant slalom – 18th place
 Women's slalom – disqualified

1968 Winter Olympics, competing for West Germany:
 Women's downhill – 14th place
 Women's giant slalom – 10th place
 Women's slalom – 6th place

References 

1945 births
Living people
German female alpine skiers
Alpine skiers at the 1964 Winter Olympics
Olympic alpine skiers of the United Team of Germany
Alpine skiers at the 1968 Winter Olympics
Olympic alpine skiers of West Germany
Sportspeople from Upper Bavaria
People from Garmisch-Partenkirchen (district)